The 5th Tennessee Infantry was an infantry regiment from Tennessee that served in the Confederate States Army.  The unit was organization at Paris, Henry County, Tennessee, on May 20, 1861. The regiment fought at New Madrid, Battle of Shiloh, Perryville, Murfreesboro, and Chickamauga.

See also 
 List of Tennessee Confederate Civil War units

References

Further reading 

 Goodspeed Publishing Co. “Confederate Military History.” In History of Tennessee, Vol. 1, 513–617. Nashville, TN: The Goodspeed Publishing Co., 1887. Reprint, Easley, SC: Southern Historical Press, 1979.
 Head, Thomas A. “The Fifth Regiment Tennessee Volunteers.” In Campaigns and Battles of the Sixteenth Regiment, Tennessee Volunteers, in the War Between the States with Incidental Sketches of the Part Performed by Other Tennessee Troops in the Same War, 1861–1865, 191–267. Nashville, TN: Cumberland Presbyterian Publishing House, 1885.
 Irion, John T. “Fifth Tennessee Infantry”. In The Military Annals of Tennessee. Confederate, compiled and edited by John Berrien Lindsley, 195–204. Nashville, TN: J. M. Lindsley & Co., 1886. Reprint, Wilmington, NC: Broadfoot Publishing Co., 1995.
 Rennolds, Lt. Edwin H. “History of the Fifth Regiment Tennessee Infantry.” In A History of the Henry County Commands Which Served in the Confederate States Army, Including Rosters of the Various Companies Enlisted in Henry County, Tennessee, 20-178, Jacksonville, FL: Sun Publishing Co., 1904.

5th Tennessee Infantry Regiment
5th Tennessee Infantry Regiment
5th Tennessee Infantry Regiment